Pat Henry (born July 22, 1951) is the current track and field coach at Texas A&M University. He is also the former track and field coach at Louisiana State University (LSU) where he won 27 national championships.

Coaching career
Henry began his coaching career at Hobbs (NM) High School, where he led his teams to five state championships. In 1983, he moved to Blinn College in Brenham, Texas. Only three years after taking over the program, he won his first of two consecutive National Junior College National Titles. 

In 1987, he was hired by LSU for the track and field and cross country teams. In his first year at LSU, he won a national championship, three SEC titles and earned two conference Coach of the Year awards. Henry won 27 national titles, 19 SEC titles, 15 SEC Coach of the Year awards and five National Coach of the Year honors at LSU. He would win both the men's and women's national titles in both 1989 and 1990.

At LSU, he produced 37 Olympians and 38 World Championship competitors during the Henry era, totals that include three Olympic Gold Medalists and five medalists at the World Championships.

In 2004, he was hired by Texas A&M as head track and field coach. In Henry's tenure at Texas A&M, his teams have finished in the top ten at NCAA meets 14 times and won eight Big 12 titles, earning Henry the title of Big 12 Coach of the Year eight times. In 2009, 2010 and 2011 he won both the men's and women's outdoor national titles.

Henry is the only coach in NCAA history to win both men's and women's track and field national titles in the same year; he has accomplished the feat five times with two different programs (LSU in 1989 and 1990 and Texas A&M in 2009, 2010 and 2011).

In 2006, Henry served as head track & field coach for the U.S. Team at the IAAF World Cup. He was inducted into the Texas Sports Hall of Fame in 2017.

Yearly results

† Henry earned Coach of the Year honors for results.

Personal life
Pat married Gail Henry. They have two kids Brandon and Shelly. Shelly was married to Seth Daigle and they had two kids, Avery and Luke Daigle. While their youngest Brandon married Brandie Henry and they have two kids. In 2005 they gave birth to Katie Ruth Henry, and in 2007 Morgan Shelly Henry.

See also
LSU Tigers track and field
LSU Lady Tigers track and field
LSU Tigers cross country
LSU Lady Tigers cross country
Texas A&M Aggies

References

External links
 LSU Tigers bio
 Texas A&M Aggies bio

1951 births
Living people
Blinn College
LSU Tigers and Lady Tigers cross country coaches
LSU Tigers and Lady Tigers track and field coaches
Texas A&M Aggies track and field coaches
College track and field coaches in the United States
University of New Mexico alumni
Western New Mexico University alumni
Sportspeople from Albuquerque, New Mexico